The Magical Treatise of Solomon, sometimes known as Hygromanteia or Hygromancy of Solomon, the Solomonikê (Σολομωνική), or even Little Key of the Whole Art of Hygromancy, Found by Several Craftsmen and by the Holy Prophet Solomon, refers to a group of similar late Byzantine-era grimoires purporting to contain Solomon's instructions to his son Rehoboam on various magical techniques and tools to summon and control different spirits, those spirits' powers, astrological beliefs, select charms, different means of divination, and the magical uses of herbs.

History and influence 
The oldest manuscripts are from the fourteenth century, and the majority from the fifteenth century, but Pablo A. Torijano's claim that it is based on material going as far back as the sixth century is either accepted or at least regarded as plausible.  Ioannis Marathakis, while not denying the possibility of Torijano's theory, suggests that some time between the thirteenth or fourteenth centuries is more likely.  The Magical Treatise of Solomon served as a bridge between the Roman-era Testament of Solomon and the renaissance Key of Solomon.  Early copies of the Magical Treatise were appended to or incorporated elements of the Testament of Solomon, while one of the earliest manuscripts of the Key of Solomon is also classified as a late copy of the Magical Treatise.  Some manuscripts featured demons assigned to the four cardinal directions, distinct from those found in the Lesser Key of Solomon and related works, but very similar to those found in later works such as the Grand Grimoire and Grimoirium Verum.  Portions of the Treatise also have some relationship to the Heptameron of Pietro d'Abano, the Lesser Key of Solomon, and the Sworn Book of Honorius; and select ideas may bear distant relationships to the Book of Abramelin, the Greek Magical Papyri (particularly "The Sword of Dardanus"), Sefer Raziel HaMalakh, Sepher Ha-Razim, the Sword of Moses, and the Cyranides

Contents 
The Magical Treatise provides instructions on how to create planetary, daily, and hourly talismans, a magic sword, vessels for divination and conjuration, wax figures, scrolls (written in the blood of a bat), a ring, special clothing, and a garland, all intended to control summoned spirits.  Angelic conjurations, general prayers to God, and prayers to control planetary influences are listed.  Astrological beliefs, including supposed relationship between planets and select plants, are presented as esoteric knowledge.  Different angels and demons over different planets, days, and hours are named, as well as what function they perform, although the lists are mostly unique to each manuscript.  Angels mentioned include Michael, Gabriel, Uriel, Raphael, and Anael.  Demons mentioned include Asmodeus, Abizouth, Oniskeliá, Lucifer (as Loutzipher), Astaroth, and Beelzebub.

Editions 
The Magical Treatise of Solomon, or Hygromanteia; Trans. & Ed. Ioannis Marathakis, Fore. Stephen Skinner; Golden Hoard Press, 2011.
Translation of select manuscripts in Solomon, the Esoteric King: From King to Magus, Development of a Tradition (pp. 231–309); by Pablo A. Torijano, Brill, Jan 2002.  Also featured in pp. 311–325 of Old Testament Pseudepigrapha: More Noncanonical Scriptures, Volume 1; ed.s Richard Bauckham, James R. Davila, Alexander Panayotov; Wm. B. Eerdmans Publishing, 2013.
Transcription of one manuscript in Anecdota Atheniensia (pp. 397–445), by Armand Delatte; Liége, 1927. Noted to be the most well known available on archive.org ( https://archive.org/details/MN40020ucmf_0 )

References

External links 
-A Grimoire Wish List: The Magical Treatise of Solomon - part 1 & part 2
-On The Shelf Review - Hygromanteia - a review of Marathakis's translation, The Magical Treatise of Solomon.

Byzantine literature
Goetia
Grimoires
Solomon
Pseudepigraphy
Treatises